Major-General Caledon Richard Egerton (28 July 1814 – 27 May 1874) was a senior British Army officer from the Egerton family who went on to be Military Secretary.

Military career
Egerton was commissioned into the 89th Regiment of Foot. He was appointed adjutant of his regiment in 1836.

He served in the Crimean War and was decorated with the Order of the Medjidie (5th Class). He features in a photograph taken in the Crimea by Roger Fenton (1855 – Officers & Men of the 89th Regiment).

He was appointed deputy adjutant-general in 1866  and Military Secretary in 1871.

He was also colonel of the 89th Regiment of Foot.

Family
In 1843 he married Margaret Cumming, and they went on to have seven sons and two daughters. Four of their sons were knighted, including Field Marshal Sir Charles Egerton, Sir Reginald Egerton (private secretary to the postmaster-general), Admiral Sir George Egerton, and Sir Brian Egerton (tutor to Ganga Singh, the Maharaja of Bikaner).

References

External links
 Cracroft's Peerage

 

1814 births
1874 deaths
Royal Irish Fusiliers officers
British Army major generals
British Army personnel of the Crimean War
Recipients of the Order of the Medjidie, 5th class